Blackbutt North is a rural locality in the South Burnett Region, Queensland, Australia.

Geography 
The land use is predominantly rural residential, extending from the town of Blackbutt to the south.

History 

On 1 February 2018, Blackbutt North's postcode changed from 4306 to 4314.

References 

South Burnett Region
Localities in Queensland